Leptamma is a monotypic moth genus of the family Erebidae erected by Max Gaede in 1939. Its only species, Leptamma flexuosa, was first described by Alice Ellen Prout in 1927. It is found in Cameroon, Gabon and São Tomé.

References

Calpinae
Monotypic moth genera